"Neighbourhood" is a song by Liverpudlian band Space, written by band members Tommy Scott and Franny Griffiths and released as the second single from their debut album, Spiders, and their third single altogether. It was originally released on 25 March 1996 and peaked at number 56 on the UK Singles Chart, but it was later re-released on 21 October that year, this time peaking at number 11. Outside the UK, "Neighbourhood" reached number 18 in Iceland, number 22 in New Zealand and number 90 in Australia.

In September 2004, "Neighbourhood" was used by the BBC in an ident for their short-lived series Fat Nation. The line "Who lives in a house like this?" is thought to be a reference to Through the Keyhole, another BBC programme. The song is also on the soundtrack from the 1997 movie "Shooting Fish".

Content

The lyrics to "Neighbourhood" were partially inspired by frontman Tommy Scott's upbringing in the Liverpool housing estate Cantril Farm (which has since been reestablished as Stockbridge Village), yet it stays true to the band's twisted sense of humour by depicting a variety of somewhat warped personalities including a man who thinks he's Saddam Hussein, Mr Miller, a "local vicar and a serial killer," a "big butch queen" who's "bigger than Tyson and twice as mean," and others.

Critical reception
British magazine Music Week rated the song four out of five, adding that "a Latin feel and Spaghetti Western touches give an extra dimension to this foot-tapping groove from the new Liverpuddlian foursome." For the 1996 re-release, the magazine again gave it four out of five. The reviewer wrote, "A hint of ska and a steel guitar sound help produce a novelty spin to this re-release, which should continue the Liverpool band's upward rise."

Track listings

Initial release

UK cassette single
 "Neighbourhood" (radio edit)
 "Turn Me On to Spiders"
 "Rejects"

UK CD single
 "Neighbourhood" (radio edit)
 "Turn Me On to Spiders"
 "Rejects"
 "Neighbourhood" (Live It! club mix)

UK 12-inch single
A1. "Neighbourhood" (Live It! club mix)
A2. "Neighbourhood" (Live It! instrumental club mix)
B1. "Neighbourhood" (Pissed Up Stomp mix)
B2. "Neighbourhood" (radio edit)

Re-issue

UK cassette single
 "Neighbourhood" (radio edit)
 "Only Half an Angel"

UK CD1
 "Neighbourhood" (radio edit)
 "Only Half an Angel"
 "Crisis"
 "Shut Your Mouth"

UK CD2
 "Neighbourhood" (radio edit)
 "Welcome to the Neighbourhood" (remix by Franny Aspirin)
 "Nighthood" (remix by Franny Aspirin)
 "Neighbourhood" (Pissed Up Stomp mix)

Charts

References

External links
 "Neighbourhood" article
 "Neighbourhood" re-issue article

Space (English band) songs
1996 singles
1996 songs
LGBT-related songs
Songs about crime
Songs about Liverpool